The Ajax Youth Academy (Dutch: Ajax Jeugdopleiding) is a football youth academy based in Amsterdam, Netherlands, from where the organization manages a total of 13 youth teams (ages 7–18). The academy is the primary youth clinic of Dutch football team Ajax Amsterdam. The club depends heavily on the youth academy as they move promising youngsters from the youth teams to the senior team where they can showcase their talent and develop into stars. 

On 11 September 2020, the CIES released their annual rankings of the clubs having trained the most players active in 31 top divisions of UEFA member associations. The Ajax Youth Academy came in 2nd place to the FK Partizan Academy from Serbia with 77 players footballers trained, while the Serbian side topped the list with 85 footballers trained. In accordance with the UEFA definition, players who were considered have been playing for the club for at least three seasons between 15 and 21 years of age.

History

The Ajax youth system is famous for having produced and still producing many great Dutch internationals like Sjaak Swart, Johan Cruijff, Frank Rijkaard, Dennis Bergkamp, Frank and Ronald de Boer, Edgar Davids, Clarence Seedorf, Patrick Kluivert, Rafael van der Vaart, Wesley Sneijder, John Heitinga, Nigel de Jong, Maarten Stekelenburg, and Gregory van der Wiel.

Notable former players 

1900-1970s
 Johan Cruijff
 Bobby Haarms
 Barry Hulshoff
 Piet Keizer
 Ruud Krol
 Rinus Michels
 Johnny Rep
 Wim Suurbier
 Sjaak Swart
1980s
 Marco van Basten
 John Bosman
 Frank de Boer
 Ronald de Boer
 Frank Rijkaard
 John van 't Schip
 Aron Winter
 Richard Witschge

1990s
 Dennis Bergkamp
 Edgar Davids
 Patrick Kluivert
 Andy van der Meyde
 Michael Reiziger
 Edwin van der Sar
 Clarence Seedorf
2000s
 Toby Alderweireld
 Ryan Babel
 Daley Blind
 John Heitinga
 Nigel de Jong
 Wesley Sneijder
 Rafael van der Vaart
 Thomas Vermaelen
 Jan Vertonghen

2010s
 Donny van de Beek
 Sergiño Dest
 Christian Eriksen
 Davy Klaassen
 Justin Kluivert 
 Matthijs de Ligt
 Ryan Gravenberch
 Noussair Mazraoui
 Abdelhak Nouri 
2020s
 Jurriën Timber

Ajax Online Academy
Central is the style of play (4-3-3, with goalkeeper), training, behavior and house rules.

Ajax has developed the so-called TIPS model, which stands for Technique, Insight, Personality and Speed. For each part there are ten criteria. P and S are generally innate properties, but I and T can always be developed further. 
Ajax coaching sessions always consists of 8 important football ingredients. Together with TIPS, they form the core to the Ajax success philosophy.

1.	Coordination training
2.	Kicking, Passing and Throw-in
3.	Moves to beat an opponent
4.	Heading
5.	Finishing
6.	Position play
7.	Position Game play
8.	Small sided games

Teams

Board and staff

Current staff
Chairman
 Frank Eijken
Head coach
 Alfred Schreuder
Technical director (upper-level A-C)
 Saïd Ouaali
Technical director (mid-level A-C)
 Patrick Ladru
Technical director (lower-level D-F)
 Michel Hordijk

List of technical directors

Facilities

Sportcomplex De Toekomst

Sportcomplex De Toekomst is the training grounds of AFC Ajax, with a capacity of 5,000 it serves as home grounds for the reserves team Jong Ajax, its women's team Ajax Vrouwen, its amateur team Ajax Zaterdag as well as for the full youth system. The entire complex consists of seven fields and a trainings center.

adidas miCoach Performance Centre
Established in 2011, the adidas MiCoach Performance Centre is situated on Sportpark De Toekomst. Built by Poly-Ned, it teaches football innovation and training methods and is used by both the first team, as well as the youth teams. Here the players are trained in a scientific manner based on motion analytics to enhance speed, distance, dribbling, heading and shooting. On 28 October 2013 the ceiling of the main hall of the facility had collapsed, which the club in turn had to have rebuilt.

Honours

National titles
A-junioren Eredivisie : 13
 1992–93, 1993–94, 1994–95, 1995–96, 1996–97, 1997–98, 2001–02, 2003–04, 2004–05, 2005–06, 2010–11, 2011–12, 2013–14
A-junioren Eerste Divisie : 4
 2004–05, 2007–08, 2008–09, 2010–11
B-junioren Eredivisie : 4
 2002–03, 2007–08, 2009–10, 2011–12
B-junioren Eerste Divisie : 1
 2006–07
C-junioren Algeheel landskampioen : 1
 2011–12
C-junioren Eerste Divisie : 2
 2008–09, 2011–12
C 2 kampioen : 2
 2009–10, 2011–12
D-junioren Algeheel landskampioen : 1
 2011–12
D-junioren Eerste Divisie : 7
 2001–02, 2002–03, 2003–04, 2006–07, 2007–08, 2010–11, 2011–12
D 2 District West 1 kampioen : 4
 2004–05, 2005–06, 2009–10, 2010–11
D 3 kampioen : 1
 2009–10
E 1 kampioen : 1
 2004–05
E 2 kampioen : 2
 2009–10, 2010–11
E 3 kampioen : 1
 2009–10
F 1 kampioen : 2
 2009–10, 2010–11

National cups
A-junioren Cup : 1
 2009–10
B-junioren Cup : 2
 2008–09, 2012–13
D-junioren Cup : 1
 2012–13
F-pupillen District Cup : 1
 2009–10

Dutch Super Cup
A-junioren Supercup : 4
 2005, 2006, 2011, 2014
B-junioren Supercup : 2
 2009, 2012
C-junioren Supercup : 2
 2012, 2014
D-junioren Supercup : 1
 2010

See also
 Ajax Hellas Youth Academy

References

External links
Official site
 The academy spotlight: Ajax and Barcelona – These Football Times (2015)
 Ajax FC Youth Academy in Amsterdam - Soccer Tricks (2022)

Youth
Football academies in the Netherlands
UEFA Youth League teams
NextGen series